My Oh My may refer to:

Catchphrase
 "My, oh my!", a catchphrase used by American sportscaster Dave Niehaus

Music
 My Oh My, a 2002 album by Jeff & Sheri Easter

Songs
 "My Oh My" (Aqua song), 1997
 ”My Oh My” (Camila Cabello song), 2019
 "My Oh My" (Chantay Savage song), 1999
 "My Oh My" (Sad Café song), 1980
 "My Oh My" (Slade song), 1983
 "My, Oh My" (The Wreckers song), 2006
 "My Oh My", a 2010 tribute song to Dave Niehaus by Macklemore and Ryan Lewis from The Heist
 "My Oh My", a song by Leonard Cohen from Popular Problems
 "My Oh My", a song by Girls' Generation from Love & Peace
 "My Oh My", a song by Gotthard from Silver
 "My Oh My", a song by David Gray from White Ladder
 "My Oh My", a song by Punch Brothers from The Phosphorescent Blues
 "My Oh My", a song by Tristan Prettyman from Cedar + Gold

See also 
 Me Oh My, a 2009 album by Cate Le Bon
 Oh My My (disambiguation)
 My My (disambiguation)
 My Oh My (disambiguation)